The Korean Committee of Space Technology (KCST; , Hanja: 朝鮮宇宙空間技術委員會) was the agency of the government of the Democratic People's Republic of Korea (North Korea) responsible for the country's space program. The agency was terminated and succeeded by the National Aerospace Development Administration in 2013 after the Law on Space Development was passed in the 7th session of the 12th Supreme People's Assembly.

History
Very little information on it is publicly available. It is known to have been founded sometime in the 1980s, and most likely is connected to the Artillery Guidance Bureau of the Korean People's Army.

Operations
The KCST was responsible for all operations concerning space exploration and construction of satellites. On 12 March 2009, North Korea signed the Outer Space Treaty and the Registration Convention, after a previous declaration of preparations for a new satellite launch.

Facilities

The KCST operated the Tonghae Satellite Launching Ground and Sohae Satellite Launching Station rocket launching sites, Baekdusan-1 and Unha (Baekdusan-2) launchers, Kwangmyŏngsŏng satellites.

South Korea and the United States accused North Korea of using these facilities and the rockets as a cover for a military ballistic missile testing program.

 Sohae Satellite Launching Station built from the 2000s to 2010s with a launch pad completed in 2011.
 Tonghae Satellite Launching Ground built from the 2000s to 2010s with a launch pad completed in 2011.

Projects
The DPRK twice announced that it had launched satellites: Kwangmyŏngsŏng-1 on 31 August 1998 and Kwangmyŏngsŏng-2 on 5 April 2009. The US and South Korea predicted that the launches would in actuality be military ballistic missile tests, but later confirmed that they had followed orbital launch trajectories.

In 2009, the DPRK announced more ambitious future space projects including own manned space flights and development of a manned partially reusable launch vehicle. Kwangmyŏngsŏng-3 was launched on 13 April 2012 and ended in failure shortly after launch. A follow-up attempt the following December, Kwangmyŏngsŏng-3 Unit 2 entered polar orbit as confirmed by various countries.

Launch history
This is a list of satellites launched.

See also

 List of government space agencies
 List of space agencies
 National Aerospace Development Administration

References

Space agencies
Space program of North Korea